Sir Arthur Renwick  (30 May 1837 – 23 November 1908) was an Australian physician, politician and philanthropist.

Early life
Renwick was born in Glasgow, Scotland, the son of George Renwick, a bricklayer, and his wife Christina, née Condie. His parents travelled as bounty immigrants aboard the Helen, arriving in Sydney, Australia on 21 July 1841. His father was Mayor of Redfern from February 1862 to February 1864 and from February 1867 until February 1872. Renwick was educated at Redfern Grammar School and was one of the early students of the University of Sydney, where he matriculated in 1853 and graduated B.A. in 1857. Renwick then studied at the University of Edinburgh where he graduated M.B. (1860), M.D. (1861), and F.R.C.S., Edinburgh. Renwick did further courses in Glasgow, London and Paris.

Medical career
Renwick then returned to Sydney in 1862, living in Redfern where he established a rapidly growing practice, becoming eventually one of the leading physicians and the first president of the local branch of the British Medical Association. In 1868, Renwick married Elizabeth, daughter of Rev. John Saunders, at the Redfern Congregational Church. Renwick also became an examiner in medicine at the University of Sydney, and in 1877 was elected to its senate.

Politician and philanthropist
Renwick attempted to enter the New South Wales Legislative Assembly for the university seat at the by-election in August 1879 but was defeated by Edmund Barton, however he was elected a member for East Sydney at the by-election in December 1879. He became Secretary for Mines in the third ministry of Sir Henry Parkes on 12 October 1881, but lost his seat at the election held in December 1882. He was elected for Redfern in October 1885, and was Minister of Public Instruction in the ministry of Sir Patrick Jennings from 26 February 1886 to 19 January 1887. In this year he was nominated to the Legislative Council and was a member for the remainder of his life, though never in office again. As a politician he was one of the earliest to realise the responsibility of the state towards the poor. Renwick authored the Benevolent Society's incorporation act, he founded the state children's relief department, and as president of the original committee he had much to do with the bringing in of old-age pensions in New South Wales. In spite of his heavy workload as a physician, he gave much time to Sydney hospital, was its president for 29 years, was also president for about the same period of the Benevolent Society of New South Wales, and he took much interest in the Deaf Dumb and Blind Institution, and the Royal Hospital for Women at Paddington. He became a member of the senate of the University of Sydney in 1877, and was vice-chancellor on several occasions. He was an early advocate for the foundation of a medical school at the university, and in 1877 donated £1000 to found a scholarship in the faculty of medicine. After the medical school was established in 1883 he provided the west stained-glass window in the upper hall of the medical school building. Renwick took the greatest interest in all movements for the welfare of the community, and his ability as an organiser led to his acting as a commissioner for New South Wales for the international exhibition in Melbourne in 1880, and in similar positions for exhibitions held at Amsterdam in 1883, Chicago in 1893 and Adelaide in 1887.

He was knighted in 1894. His skill for business led to his being placed on the boards of various important financial companies, but his really important work was his philanthropy.

References

 

1837 births
1908 deaths
Alumni of the University of Edinburgh
Australian Knights Bachelor
Members of the New South Wales Legislative Assembly
Members of the New South Wales Legislative Council
Fellows of the Royal College of Surgeons
Vice-Chancellors of the University of Sydney
19th-century Australian politicians
Scottish emigrants to colonial Australia